El Toro is a wooden roller coaster at Freizeitpark Plohn in Germany. It is the third roller coaster built by Great Coasters International in Europe, after Thunderbird at PowerPark in Finland and Troy at Toverland in the Netherlands. It cost 5.1 million EUR and was by the European Regional Development Fund.

Ride
They pass through two tunnels under a Log flume.

Train
El Toro has one train with twelve cars. Passengers are placed two in a row for a total of twenty-four passengers per train. It features GCI's Millennium Flyer trains.

Rankings

References